Purno Doirgho Prem Kahini 2 also known by the initialism as PDPK II, is a Bangladeshi romantic sports drama film directed by Shafi Uddin Shafi and produced by Chandan Sinha under the banner of Friends Movies International. The film features Shakib Khan, Joya Ahsan, Moushumi Hamid and Emon in lead roles and has played a negative role in this film in place of Arifin Shuvoo. The film was released on 8 April 2016,  Upon release, the film received positive reviews from critics, eventually becoming one of the highest grossing Bengali film of 2016. The film is a sequel of 2013 film Purnodoirgho Prem Kahini.

Cast

 Shakib Khan as Asad Ahmed
 Joya Ahsan as Mitu
 Emon as Rayan Khan
 Moushumi Hamid
 Omar Sani
 Sadek Bachchu
 Shirin Bakul
 Shahidul Alam Sachchu
 Johnny Hoque
 Gulshan Ara Ahmed
 Fardin Mahi
 Noor
 Johnny Haque
 Sazzad Hossain
 Sanko Panja
 Jae Mamun as 
 Asif Akbar as special appearance
 Habibul Bashar as special appearance

Production

Casting and development
The project was announced is 2014 after success of the first installment of the film. Khan portrays the role of a cricketer in the film while Joya Ahsan plays role of a ramp model. Producers of the film later announced that Arifin Shuvoo will not be seen in the film, while Mamnun Hasan Emon and Moushumi Hamid were added to the film. The filming began in Hatirjheel on 16 September 2014. The film was shot in Bangladesh and Malaysia. The film's logo was first revealed on 18 September 2015.

Soundtrack

References

External links
 
 Purno Doirgo Prem Kahini 2 at the Bangla Movies Database

2016 films
2016 romantic drama films
Bengali-language Bangladeshi films
Bangladeshi romantic drama films
Bangladeshi sequel films
Films scored by Shawkat Ali Emon
Films scored by Koushik Hossain Taposh
2010s Bengali-language films